The 1962 Kansas gubernatorial election was held on November 6, 1962. Incumbent Republican John Anderson Jr. defeated Democratic nominee Dale E. Saffels with 53.4% of the vote.

Primary elections
Primary elections were held on August 7, 1962.

Democratic primary

Candidates 
Dale E. Saffels, State Representative
George Hart, former Kansas State Treasurer

Results

Republican primary

Candidates
John Anderson Jr., incumbent Governor
Harvey F. Crouch

Results

General election

Candidates
Major party candidates
John Anderson Jr., Republican 
Dale E. Saffels, Democratic

Other candidates
Vearl Bacon, Prohibition

Results

References

1962
Kansas
Gubernatorial
November 1962 events in the United States